Kelarak may refer to:
 Kelarak, Birun Bashm
 Kelarak, Kuhestan